Jason Ebeyer (born 4 December 1992) is a 3D artist and art director from Melbourne, Australia. He is known for his detailed figures and for pioneering the glossy style of character art which has become his signature.

Early life 
Jason Ebeyer was born in 1992 in Melbourne, Australia. He studied at various schools growing up but spent his formative years receiving education at Deniliquin High School in rural NSW. In 2014, Ebeyer returned to Melbourne to study graphic design at university. He attended classes at Tractor School of Design (FKA Grenadi School of Design) in the CBD.

Career 
Ebeyer is known for his glossy figures and sensual style of artwork. Of the medium, he commented in a 2021 interview: "I've worked across lots of different mediums, from traditional illustration and painting, through to photo manipulation and collage and then finally falling into 3D software. I settled with this medium because it truly enabled me to produce the work and figures that I imagine."

Ebeyer worked on the 2018 animated video and accompanying artwork for the song “Bloom” by Troye Sivan. Ebeyer created the 3D animated video over a 4-week period in collaboration with Troye.

In 2019, Ebeyer designed and animated the launch campaign for Nikita Dragun’s cosmetics company, Dragun Beauty.

In 2020, Ebeyer animated the music video for the Steve Aoki and Icona Pop track "I Love My Friends" which released in March, 2020. Trailing the release of the music video, Jason was approached for a collaborative project with the Tom of Finland Foundation and adult entertainment company, MEN.com. Jason recreated four adult film stars for the collaboration and animated them in surreal and alien worlds. The resulting animations were then spliced into the live action footage and released on 8 May. During this time, Ebeyer was simultaneously working on large works for HUDA Beauty, Kim Petras and two more projects with Nikita Dragun, including the launch campaign for her Morphe collaboration palette. In September 2020, Vogue Italia contacted Jason to participate in a 10-page editorial spread for the coveted September Issue. Also in 2020, Ebeyer was tasked with the role of creating and developing character concepts and concept artwork for Sensorium Galaxy, an immersive VR platform which is due launch in late 2021. The project has seen Jason conceptualize over 100 characters, each with distinct styles and looks.

In 2021, Jason partnered up with American Photographer, Steven Klein. Together the pair created the March cover for V Magazine featuring a heavily stylized and surreal reimagining of rap star, Doja Cat.

References

External links 
 Official Website

Fetish artists
Digital artists
Fantasy artists
Science fiction artists
Australian artists
Australian illustrators
People from Melbourne
1992 births
Living people